The Animal Welfare Act 2006 (c 45) is an Act of the Parliament of the United Kingdom.

Overview

It is the first signing of pet law since the Protection of Animals Act 1911, which it largely replaced. It also superseded and consolidated more than 20 other pieces of legislation, such as the Protection of Animals Act 1934 and the Abandonment of Animals Act 1960. The Act introduced the new welfare offence. This means that animal owners have a positive duty  It outlaws tail docking of dogs for cosmetic reasons, with an exemption for "working" dogs, such as those used by the police, the armed forces or as service dogs.

The Act also has an offense to remove the scent glands of skunks.

The corresponding Act for Scotland is the Animal Health and Welfare (Scotland) Act 2006.

Sections

The Act is divided into several topics.

Section 1 defines an "animal" as a vertebrate (other than a human) from the sub-phylum vertebrata of the phylum chordata. A "protected" animal is defined in s2 as one that is either commonly domesticated or one that is, at the time being, under the control of a person. The act also defines the five "welfare needs"
need for a suitable environment
need for a suitable diet
need to be able to exhibit normal behaviour patterns (such as exercise)
need to be housed with, or apart, from other animals
need to be protected from pain, suffering, injury and disease.

Prevention of Harm

Offences include:

 causing a protected animal to suffer unnecessarily knowing it would suffer – s4(1)
 unreasonably allowing an animal in that person's care to suffer from somebody else – s4(2)
 mutilating an animal (except where destroying an animal in an appropriate and humane manner) – s5
 docking a dog's tail where prohibited – s6(1), s6(2), s6(3)
 shows a dog with an illegally docked tail at a dog show with fee-paying patrons – s6(9)
 administers a poison to an animal (or permits to be administered) – s7(1), s7(2)
 animal fighting – s8
 causes an animal to fight
 receives money from admission to or publicises an animal fight
 provides information about an animal fight to another to enable or encourage attendance
 makes a bet as to the outcome of an animal fight
 takes part in an animal fight
 trains an animal to take part in a fight
 keeps any animal fighting premises
 attends an animal fight (without lawful excuse)
 possesses a recording of an animal fight that took place in the UK (without lawful excuse) with intent to supply
 shows another person a recording of an animal fight that took place in the UK (without lawful excuse)

Promotion of Welfare

A person has a duty of care towards animals that person is responsible for – s9(1). Needs include suitable environment, diet, being housed with or apart from other animals, protection from pain, suffering, injury and disease.

Animals cannot be sold to children under 16 years outside a family context – s11(1), s11(6). Animals cannot be given as prizes to children under 16 years – s11(3)(b).

Licensing and Registration

An appropriate national authority can make regulations regarding the licence and registration of animals.

Codes of Practice

An appropriate national authority may issue and revise codes of practice for providing practical guidance in respect to any provision in this Act – s14(1).

Failing to comply with a code of practice's provision will not, of itself, render that person liable to proceedings of any kind. However such failure to comply may sway proceedings under other provisions in the Act – s14(3), s14(4).

Where the Secretary of State proposes to issue or revise a code of practice he must submit it to Parliament and if the draft is rejected by one House within 40 days the Secretary of State must take no further action – s15(3). If both Houses reject the draft then the Secretary of State may amend the draft and re-submit – s15(4).

Animals in Distress

An inspector may take steps felt to be immediately necessary to alleviate an animal that is suffering – s18(1) but this does not include destroying the animal – s18(2).

An inspector or constable may destroy a protected animal if:

 a veterinary surgeon certifies it is in its own interests – s18(3)
 there is no reasonable alternative to destroying it and it is not reasonably practical to wait for a veterinary surgeon – s18(4)

An inspector or constable may take into possession a protected animal if:

 a veterinary surgeon certifies it is suffering or likely to suffer – s18(5)
 the animal appears to be suffering (or is likely to) and the need for action is such it is not practical to wait for a veterinary surgeon – 18(6)

If an animal is destroyed or taken into possession and the owner doesn't know – then steps should be reasonably taken to notify the owner – s18(11).

Deliberately obstructing somebody in performance of this section of the Act is an offence – s18(12).

An inspector or constable may enter premises (other than areas of private dwelling) for the purpose of searching for a protected animal and reasonably believes that a protected animal is on the premises and the animal is suffering or likely to suffer – s19(1), s19(2). This entry may take place without a warrant using force if the entry appears required before a warrant could be obtained – s19(3).

A court has the following powers to make orders in relation to possessed animals – s20(1):

 specified treatment be administered to the animal
 possession should be given to a specified person
 the animal should be sold
 the destruction of the animal

The court will not make such orders until it has given the owner of the animal an opportunity to be heard or is satisfied that it is not practical to communicate with the owner – s20(4).

If the court requires a person to reimburse the expenses of carrying out an order that person may appeal to the Crown Court against that expense order – s21(6).

Enforcement Powers

A constable may seize an animal in relation to an animal fighting offence – s22(1).

A constable may enter and search premises (except for private dwelling areas) for the seizure of an animal related to a fighting offence if he reasonably believes there is an animal on the premises – s22(2).

Suspicion of other offences in this Act may lead to a warrant being issued authorising an inspector or constable to search for evidence of such an offence – s23(1).

An inspector may require the holder of a licence to produce any records which are required to be kept – s25(1). An inspector may carry out an inspection to check compliance with licence conditions – s26(1). An inspector may carry out an inspection to check compliance with a registration – s27(1).

An inspector may, for the purpose of inspecting conditions relating to animal welfare, carry out inspections relating to animals bred or kept for farming purposes – s28(1).

Prosecutions

If a person is convicted of an offence the court may make an order disqualifying that person from – s34(1), s34(2):

 owning animals
 keeping animals
 participating in the keeping of animals
 dealing in animals
 transporting animals
 arranging the transport of animals

The disqualification may relate to specific kinds of animal or animals generally – s34(5).

Post-Conviction Powers

A person guilty of an offence under sections 4 (unnecessary suffering), 5 (mutilation), 6(1–2) (docking dogs' tails), 7 (poisoning), 8 (fighting) shall be liable on summary conviction to imprisonment up to a year, or up to 5 years if convicted on indictment, or a fine up to £20,000 or both – section 32(1).

Section 68 – Commencement
The following orders have been made under this section:
The Animal Welfare Act 2006 (Commencement No. 1) (England) Order 2007 (S.I. 2007/499 (C. 20))
The Animal Welfare Act 2006 (Commencement No. 2 and Saving and Transitional Provisions) (England) Order 2007 (S.I. 2007/2711 (C. 105))
The Animal Welfare Act 2006 (Commencement No. 1) (Wales) Order 2007 (S.I. 2007/1030 (W. 97) (C. 43))
The Animal Welfare Act 2006 (Commencement No. 2 and Saving and Transitional Provisions) (Wales) Order 2007 (S.I. 2007/3065 (W. 262) (C. 120))
The Animal Welfare Act 2006 (Commencement No. 1) (Scotland) Order 2007 (S.S.I. 2007/519 (C. 44))

See also 
 Animal welfare in the United Kingdom

References
Halsbury's Statutes,

United Kingdom Acts of Parliament 2006
Animal welfare and rights legislation in the United Kingdom